Events from the year 1973 in Taiwan, Republic of China. This year is numbered Minguo 62 according to the official Republic of China calendar.

Incumbents
 President – Chiang Kai-shek
 Vice President – Yen Chia-kan
 Premier – Chiang Ching-kuo
 Vice Premier – Hsu Ching-chung

Events

April
 1 April – The establishment of Taiwan Water Corporation.

July
 21 July – The establishment of Flying Camel.

September
 1 September – The establishment of Criminal Investigation Bureau.

Births
 17 January – Lin Shu-fen, member of Legislative Yuan.
 21 February – Bowie Tsang, singer, actress, TV host and author.
 19 August – Huang Kuo-chang, leader of New Power Party.
 13 September – Chen Lien-hung, baseball player.
 5 October – Chen Wen-bin, former professional baseball player.
 29 October – Kelly Lin, actress and model.
 9 December – Shino Lin, singer and actress.
 18 December – Ho Hsin-chun, member of 8th and 9th Legislative Yuan.
 30 December – Chen Je-chang, professional baseball player.

Deaths
 10 March – Li Mi, general.

References

 
Years of the 20th century in Taiwan